Annabel Ellwood (born 2 February 1978) is a former professional tennis player from Australia. She is the sister of former ATP Tour professional Ben Ellwood.

Ellwood, a right-handed player, born in Canberra, competed at seven Australian Open tournaments from 1995 to 2001. At the 1998 Australian Open, she was beaten by Amanda Coetzer in the third round, her best singles result at a Grand Slam event.

WTA career finals

Doubles: 1 (runner-up)

ITF finals

Singles (9–9)

Doubles (14–5)

References

External links
 
 
 

Australian female tennis players
Hopman Cup competitors
Sportspeople from Canberra
Tennis people from the Australian Capital Territory
Living people
1978 births
Sportswomen from the Australian Capital Territory